Hamilton Academical Women Football Club is a women's football club affiliated with Hamilton Academical. The team currently competes in the Scottish Women's Premier League 1, the top division of women's football in Scotland, and plays its home games at New Douglas Park.

History
Founded in 1995 as Hamilton Athletic LFC and elected to the Scottish Women's Football League the same year, the club won promotion in each of its first three seasons to join the Scottish Women's Premier League in 2002. After a season as FC Hamilton in 2002–03, the club came under the auspices of professional men's club Hamilton Academical F.C. and adopted their current name. Hamilton finished second in SWPL2 in the 2020–2021 season and were promoted alongside champions Aberdeen to SWPL1.

Stadium 
The club, who previously played at the Castle Park ground of Blantyre Victoria, currently plays its home games at New Douglas Park.

Players

Current squad

Staff

Coaching and medical staff

 Manager: Gary Doctor
 Assistant manager: Robert Watson
 First-team coach: Fiona Dainty
 Goalkeeping coach: Jamie Strachan
 Coach: Amy Lindsay
 S&C coach: Luke Murray
 Physiotherapist: Amanda Weir
 Head of youth academy: Lynsey Hogg

Honours
 Scottish Women's Premier League 2:
 Winners (1): 2016
 Runners Up (1): 2021

See also
:Category:Hamilton Academical W.F.C. players

References

External links
Official website
Official website (pre-2015)
Soccerway

Women's football clubs in Scotland
Women
1999 establishments in Scotland
Football in South Lanarkshire
Scottish Women's Premier League clubs